Article 99 is a 1992 American comedy-drama film directed by Howard Deutch and written by Ron Cutler. It was produced by Orion Pictures, and starring Kiefer Sutherland, Ray Liotta, Forest Whitaker, John C. McGinley, Rutanya Alda and Lea Thompson. The soundtrack was composed by Danny Elfman. The film's title supposedly refers to a legal loophole, which states that unless an illness/injury is related to military service, a veteran is not eligible for VA hospital benefits.

Plot
Peter Morgan, a young doctor, starts a new job at Monument Heights Veterans' Hospital in Washington, D.C. The government-funded hospital is suffering from cutbacks upheld by Executive Director Dr. Henry Dreyfoos. Morgan only plans to work in the hospital temporarily before starting private practice. On his first day, Morgan finds himself out of his depth working amidst the chaos. One of the patients, veteran ‘Shooter’ Polaski, snaps after being given an Article 99 form, which states the hospital finds the patient ineligible for immediate treatment because the supposed ailment is not service-related. Polaski proceeds to drive through the hospital's entrance and starts a shooting rampage with his M16. A group of doctors led by Dr. Richard Sturgess are able to disarm Polaski.

After this traumatic incident, Sturgess takes Morgan under his wing. Sturgess, as well as his colleagues Rudy Bobrick, Sid Handleman and Robin Van Dorn, are defiant of Dreyfoos' belt-tightening policies. Sturgess does midnight raids on medical supply rooms and tries to get Morgan to join him, but Morgan refuses, fearing repercussions to his medical career.

Meanwhile, Morgan befriends World War II veteran Sam Abrams, who is considered by the hospital a 'gomer'—a person who cannot be admitted even with a critical condition and has to be constantly moved around so administration will not discharge him. Abrams' bond with Morgan has the new doctor increasingly growing discontent with the hospital's conditions.

Through overhearing Dreyfoos' phone conversation, Morgan learns a new shipment of cardiac surgery tools is stored in the pathology department. He relays this info to Sturgess, who does a midnight raid to get the tools. However, this turns out to be a trap set by Dreyfoos, who films the theft and blackmails Sturgess into voluntary suspension and a declaration of guilt if charges are brought. Shortly after, Abrams passes away, heavily affecting Morgan as he feels he failed his patient. Morgan eventually finds Dreyfoos' film and, infuriated he was used as bait, declares open rebellion against Dreyfoos, resulting in his own suspension.

Morgan and Sturgess, along with wiseguy veteran Luther Jerome, begin planning a hostile takeover to properly attend to the patients without the administration's interference. The veterans successfully lock out the security guards while Dreyfoos is away. Police gather outside but cannot remove the veterans as the hospital is under federal jurisdiction. News of the standoff reaches the FBI and the Inspector General, who arrives to assess the situation. The Inspector General attempts to negotiate with Luther, but Luther stands his ground as the veterans unfurl a massive banner in the hospital stating 'No Surrender'.

The FBI prepares to retake the hospital by force, cutting off the power and issuing a final warning. Sturgess convinces Luther to lay down resistance and reopen the hospital. The Inspector General and Dreyfoos enter the building and attempt to arrest Morgan, but Morgan stands his ground. The Inspector General discloses he himself is a Vietnam veteran, and acknowledging the situation the hospital is facing, he suspends Dreyfoos from the hospital management. Morgan decides to become a permanent resident in Monument Heights as no prosecutions are made.

Victory is sadly short-lived, as Dreyfoos' unnamed replacement decides to continue Dreyfoos' previous policies. Morgan and Sturgess vow to take a stand against the 'new' administration.

Cast
 Ray Liotta as Dr. Richard Sturgess
 Kiefer Sutherland as Dr. Peter Morgan
 Forest Whitaker as Dr. Sid Handleman
 Lea Thompson as Dr. Robin Van Dorn
 John C. McGinley as Dr. Rudy Bobrick
 John Mahoney as Dr. Henry Dreyfoos
 Keith David as Luther Jerome
 Kathy Baker as Dr. Diana Walton
 Eli Wallach as Sam Abrams
 Troy Evans as Pat Travis
 Noble Willingham as Inspector General
 Lynne Thigpen as Nurse White
 Jeffrey Tambor as Dr. Leo Krutz
 Rutanya Alda as Ann Travis

Production
The movie was filmed in Kansas City, Missouri. Many downtown landmarks can be seen in the movie’s introduction and throughout, including the Liberty Memorial. The hospital that was used in the film was known as St. Mary's Hospital and sat across the street from the Liberty Memorial. The former hospital was slated for demolition in 2004, and razed in 2005 to make way for a new Federal Reserve Bank building.

Reception
The film earned $ ($ in today's terms) in its opening weekend (March 13, 1992), screening in 1,262 theaters, and ranking it as the number 6 film of that weekend. It earned a total domestic gross of $ ($ in today's terms).

The film received mixed reviews and has a rating of 43% based on 14 reviews on review aggregate site Rotten Tomatoes.

Audiences surveyed by CinemaScore gave the film a grade "B+" on scale of A to F.

See also
 Walter Reed Army Medical Center neglect scandal
 Coming Home
 Born on the Fourth of July

References

External links
 
 

 Article 99 at Metro-Goldwyn-Mayer (US distributor)
 Movie Review: Article 99, Deseret Morning News, Mar. 13, 1992

1992 films
1992 comedy-drama films
American comedy-drama films
1990s English-language films
Medical-themed films
Films directed by Howard Deutch
Films set in psychiatric hospitals
Films scored by Danny Elfman
Orion Pictures films
Films set in Washington, D.C.
Films about veterans
1990s American films